Meriem Ben Mami is a Tunisian actress.

Filmography

Cinema 
 2013 : Les Épines du jasmin by Rachid Ferchiou

Television

series 
 2008 - 2014 : Maktoub by Sami Fehri : Chahinez Maaouia
 2013 - 2014 : Caméra Café by Ibrahim Letaïef : Douja
 2013 : Happy Ness (season 1) by Majdi Smiri : Mimi
 2015 : Histoires tunisiennes by Nada Mezni Hafaiedh : Inès
 2017 : Dawama by Naim Ben Rhouma
 2018 : Familia Lol by Nejib Mnasria : Farah El Ayech
 2018 : Tej El Hadhra by Sami Fehri : Lalla Douja

Emissions 
 2012 : Le Crocodile (episode 5) on Ettounsiya TV
 2013 : Le Braquage (episode 10) on Nessma
 2015 : Dari Déco on Ettounsiya TV : animator
 2016 : Tahadi El Chef (episode 21) on M Tunisia
 2016 : Omour Jedia on Ettounsiya TV : chronicler
 2017 : Aroussa w Aris on El Hiwar El Tounsi : animator

Videos 
 2011 : I Love Tunisia, the place to be now by Mohamed Ali Nahdi and Majdi Smiri
 2015 : advertising spot for the Shampoo Sensea

References

External links

Tunisian film actresses
People from Tunis
Living people
20th-century Tunisian actresses
Year of birth missing (living people)